Nigel Edward Wilson (born January 12, 1970) is a Canadian former Major League Baseball player from Oshawa, Ontario. He played for the Florida Marlins, Cincinnati Reds, and Cleveland Indians. He also spent six highly successful seasons in Nippon Professional Baseball with the Nippon Ham Fighters and Osaka Kintetsu Buffaloes. He now owns a sports training facility in Ajax, Ontario.

Career
Wilson signed with the Toronto Blue Jays in 1988 as an amateur free agent and was promoted as high as Double-A in the Toronto organization.

Wilson was then drafted by the Florida Marlins in the 1992 MLB Expansion Draft as their first pick (second overall, behind David Nied by the Colorado Rockies).

Wilson played a total of 22 major league games with the Marlins (1993), Cincinnati Reds (1995), and Cleveland Indians (1996), failing to get a hit as either a Marlin or a Red, going 0-for-23 in his time with these teams, with 15 strikeouts and no walks or HBPs.

After an 0-for-2 start with the Indians (with 1 strikeout), Wilson recorded his first major league hit in his 26th at bat. His major league career ended shortly thereafter; Wilson retired with 3 MLB hits in total.

In 1997, he joined the Nippon Ham Fighters of the Japanese Pacific League after being released from the Indians.

On June 21, 1997, he hit home runs in 4 consecutive at bats, becoming only the second player in Japanese baseball history to ever attain this mark after Sadaharu Oh, ending that season with a league-leading 37 home runs.

In 1998, he greatly improved his clutch hitting, leading the league with 33 home runs and 128 RBIs to win the Best Nine Award for designated hitter.

In 1999, he played only 6 games due to a knee injury, but the team decided not to release him at the end of the season. The team's decision proved to be correct, as Wilson rebounded in 2000, hitting 37 home runs with 89 RBIs to win his second Best Nine Award.

Wilson sustained another injury in 2001, and left the team after playing only 34 games that year then was picked up by the Osaka Kintetsu Buffaloes the following year, but could not repeat his earlier success. He left Japan at the end of 2002, and signed a minor league contract with the New York Yankees organization, but did not make it into a major league roster.

Wilson is remembered as one of the best non-Japanese players ever to play for the Nippon Ham Fighters, along with Tony Solaita and Sherman Obando.

Personal

Wilson's father was a cricket player from Trinidad.

Wilson resides in Ajax, Ontario with his wife, Natalie Wilson and their three children, Morgan, Paris and Quinton.

He also has an older daughter, LaToya Forever, a YouTube personality who and cast member of The Real Housewives of Atlanta.

Wilson has owned and run the Competitive Edge sports training facility in Ajax since 2008.

Wilson has coached many successful college players.

References

External links
 , or Retrosheet, or Baseball Reference (Minor and Japanese Leagues)
Pelota Binaria (Venezuelan Winter League)

1970 births
Living people
Baseball people from Ontario
Black Canadian baseball players
Buffalo Bisons (minor league) players
Canadian expatriate baseball players in Japan
Canadian expatriate baseball players in the United States
Canadian sportspeople of Trinidad and Tobago descent
Cardenales de Lara players
Caribes de Oriente players
Canadian expatriate baseball players in Venezuela
Cincinnati Reds players
Cleveland Indians players
Dunedin Blue Jays players
Edmonton Trappers players
Florida Marlins players
Indianapolis Indians players
Knoxville Blue Jays players
Major League Baseball outfielders
Major League Baseball players from Canada
Myrtle Beach Blue Jays players
Nippon Ham Fighters players
Nippon Professional Baseball designated hitters
Osaka Kintetsu Buffaloes players
Sportspeople from Oshawa
St. Catharines Blue Jays players